Dinak (also Romanized as Dīnak; also known as Danīk and Donyak) is a village in Rudpey-ye Jonubi Rural District, in the Central District of Sari County, Mazandaran Province, Iran. At the 2006 census, its population was 1,112, in 286 families.

References 

Populated places in Sari County